Saratoga is a town in Wilson County, North Carolina, United States. The population was 408 at the 2010 census.

History
The Maj. James Scarborough House was listed on the National Register of Historic Places in 1982.

Geography
Saratoga is located at  (35.653630, -77.776493).

Demographics

As of the census of 2000, there were 379 people, 158 households, and 102 families residing in the town. The population density was 590.3 people per square mile (228.6/km). There were 168 housing units at an average density of 261.7 per square mile (101.4/km). The racial makeup of the town was 76.25% White, 19.79% African American, 3.43% from other races, and 0.53% from two or more races. Hispanic or Latino of any race were 5.80% of the population.

There were 158 households, out of which 28.5% had children under the age of 18 living with them, 43.7% were married couples living together, 20.3% had a female householder with no husband present, and 35.4% were non-families. 32.3% of all households were made up of individuals, and 17.1% had someone living alone who was 65 years of age or older. The average household size was 2.40 and the average family size was 2.95.

In the town, the population was spread out, with 23.5% under the age of 18, 5.8% from 18 to 24, 29.6% from 25 to 44, 23.5% from 45 to 64, and 17.7% who were 65 years of age or older. The median age was 40 years. For every 100 females, there were 84.0 males. For every 100 females age 18 and over, there were 75.8 males.

The median income for a household in the town was $31,667, and the median income for a family was $37,750. Males had a median income of $33,125 versus $25,469 for females. The per capita income for the town was $15,317. About 8.2% of families and 13.1% of the population were below the poverty line, including 16.4% of those under age 18 and 8.7% of those age 65 or over.

References

External links
 City-data.com entry for Saratoga, NC

Towns in Wilson County, North Carolina
Towns in North Carolina